Astralium okamotoi is a species of sea snail, a marine gastropod mollusk in the family Turbinidae, the turban snails.

Description
The size of the shell varies between 15 mm and 40 mm.

Distribution
This marine shell occurs off Japan and the Philippines.

References

External links
 To World Register of Marine Species
 

okamotoi
Gastropods described in 1961